The Sunda zebra finch (Taeniopygia guttata) is a species of bird in the family Estrildidae. It is found in the Lesser Sundas.

Parasites
T. guttata sometimes serves as a model organism. Study of the immune response of T. guttata to parasites is informative for avians as a class. Its transcriptome responses to infection have been studied by Watson et al., 2017 and Scalf et al., 2019. T. guttata is not known to have ever been infected with any Plasmodium. Valkiūnas et al., 2018 find T. guttata seems totally resistant to the malaria parasite that is most common among avians, Plasmodium relictum.

References

 Gill F, D Donsker & P Rasmussen  (Eds). 2022. IOC World Bird List (v12.1). doi :  10.14344/IOC.ML.12.1

Taeniopygia
Birds described in 1817
Taxa named by Louis Jean Pierre Vieillot